Paul Rabil (born December 14, 1985) is an American former professional lacrosse player and co-founder of the Premier Lacrosse League. He played for the Cannons Lacrosse Club and Atlas Lacrosse Club of the Premier Lacrosse League, as well as the Boston Cannons and the New York Lizards of Major League Lacrosse and the San Jose/Washington Stealth and Philadelphia Wings of the National Lacrosse League.

Youth
Rabil was born in Gaithersburg, Maryland. He started playing lacrosse at the age of 12. He attended Watkins Mill High School in Montgomery Village, Maryland, then went on to graduate from DeMatha Catholic High School in Hyattsville, Maryland. He then played collegiate lacrosse at Johns Hopkins University.

MLL career
Rabil was selected 1st overall by the Boston Cannons in the 2008 Major League Lacrosse Collegiate Draft. That year, he also competed in the MLL All-Star Game.

In 2009, Rabil was named the MLL MVP and MLL Offensive Player of the Year.

In 2010, Rabil competed in his third consecutive All-Star team and was named First-Team All-Pro.

In 2011, Rabil was named the MLL MVP and MLL Offensive Player of the Year for the second time. He also won the MLL Bud Light Skills Competition in 2011, making him the first player to have won both the Skills Competition and the MLL Fastest Shot competition. Many have named him the best lacrosse player in the world.

In 2012, Rabil was declared the MLL Offensive Player of the Year for the third time, tying the league record for most season-ending awards by a player. He also set the single-season points record (72) while playing midfield for the Boston Cannons.

In 2014, Rabil was named to his seventh consecutive All-Star team and named MLL First-Team All-Pro for the sixth consecutive year.

On January 5, 2015, Rabil was traded to the New York Lizards, along with fellow midfielder Mike Stone for veteran Max Seibald and draft picks.

Rabil played in and started 12 out of the 14 regular-season games.  He had 24 goals, 15 assists, and 3 2-point goals in the regular season.  On August 1, 2015, Rabil had two goals and two assists in a semifinal playoff game against the Boston Cannons.  New York would win in overtime 16–15.  On August 8, 2015, Rabil had 3 goals and 3 assists as the Lizards defeated the Rochester Rattlers 15–12 in the MLL Steinfeld Cup Championship game.  This made Paul Rabil a 2 time Steinfeld Cup Champion as he finished off the season with a total of 29 goals and 20 assists.  He was named the Coca-Cola Player of the Game MVP of the championship.

NLL career
Rabil was drafted second overall in the 2008 National Lacrosse League entry draft. Paul was a part of the 2010 Washington Stealth National Lacrosse League Champion's Cup team, defeating the Toronto Rock. Paul scored two goals in the championship game.

In 2010, Rabil set the Washington Stealth team record for loose balls in a season, snagging 153 in 16 National Lacrosse League games.

In January 2012, Rabil was selected to his second consecutive National Lacrosse League All-Star game. Since entering the NLL, he has been selected to every All-Star game in each season he has played.

In February 2012, Rabil was traded to the Edmonton Rush in exchange for Athan Iannucci, but subsequently refused to report to the Rush. He was placed on the hold-out list and did not play the rest of the 2012 season.

On July 27, 2012, Rabil was traded to the Rochester Knighthawks for Jarrett Davis. After he did not report to training camp, he was traded along with three other players to the Philadelphia Wings for Dan Dawson, Paul Dawson, and a first round draft pick.

Rabil has not played in the NLL since 2013.

Premier Lacrosse League Founder
Paul Rabil and his brother, Mike Rabil, founded the PLL with known investors The Chernin Group and The Raine Group as direct competition to the MLL. Rabil, who was one of the only lacrosse players at the time to make a living from the sport, campaigned for higher wages, stock, and benefits to the players to try and make the game their full-time jobs. The league's inaugural season debuted June 1, 2019. He was selected to the league’s first All-Star game in Los Angeles, California and was showcased on SportCenter Top 10 for an impressive around-the-world pass.

During his time in the PLL, Rabil was a midfielder for the Atlas Lacrosse Club and the Cannons Lacrosse Club.

He announced his retirement from professional lacrosse in September 2021.

Personal life
Paul Rabil married Kelly Berger in January 2014. They divorced in 2017. Rabil was in a relationship with actress Eiza González before they split in 2021.

Awards and achievements

High school
3× Washington Catholic Athletic Conference champion (DeMatha Catholic High School; 2002–2004)
2× High school All-American (2003, 2004)
The Washington Posts First-Team (2003)
The Washington Posts Player of the Year (2004)

College
 USILA Third Team All-American (2005)
2× NCAA Division I champion (Johns Hopkins Blue Jays; 2005, 2007)
3× USILA First Team All-American (2006–2008)

International
World Lacrosse Championship Best Midfielder (2010)
3× World Lacrosse Championship All-Tournament Team (2010, 2014, 2018)
World Lacrosse Championship MVP (2010)
World Lacrosse Championship Winner United States of America (2010)
World Lacrosse Championship FIL Best Midfielder (2014)

Statistics
Rabil previously held the record for the world's fastest lacrosse shot at 111 mph. This was later broken by Zak Dorn at a competition in 2014.

PLL

NLL
Reference:

MLL

NCAA

References

People from Gaithersburg, Maryland
Philadelphia Wings players
Sportspeople from Maryland
Washington Stealth players
American people of Middle Eastern descent
1985 births
Living people
Premier Lacrosse League
Premier Lacrosse League players
DeMatha Catholic High School alumni
Johns Hopkins Blue Jays men's lacrosse players